Ignacio Garrido (born 27 March 1972) is a Spanish professional golfer who won twice on the European Tour.

Garrido was born  in Madrid. He is the eldest son of Antonio Garrido who won five times on the European Tour and also played in the 1979 Ryder Cup.

His uncle, Germán Garrido, also has won on the European Tour.

Professional career
Garrido turned professional in 1993 and after playing the Challenge Tour that year, he joined the European Tour in 1994. His best year on the Tour was 1997, when he finished sixth on the Order of Merit. Garrido and his father were the first father and son combination to have won on the European Tour since it began in 1972.

One of the highlights of his career was playing for Europe winning the 1997 Ryder Cup on Spanish soil, for the first time in Europe played outside the British Isles and with Seve Ballesteros as the first Spanish captain of the European team. The Garridos were the second father and son combination to have played in the Ryder Cup after Percy and Peter Alliss.

Another highlight of Garido's career was winning the prestigious Volvo PGA Championship at Wentworth Club, England, in 2003, beating Trevor Immelman in a playoff.

Professional wins (4)

European Tour wins (2)

European Tour playoff record (1–1)

Challenge Tour wins (1)

Other wins (1)

Results in major championships

CUT = missed the half-way cut
"T" = tied

Results in World Golf Championships

"T" = Tied

Team appearances
Amateur
European Boys' Team Championship (representing Spain): 1990 (winners)
European Amateur Team Championship (representing Spain): 1991
Eisenhower Trophy (representing Spain): 1992
St Andrews Trophy (representing the Continent of Europe): 1992

Professional
Dunhill Cup (representing Spain): 1995, 1996, 1997
World Cup (representing Spain): 1995, 1996, 1997, 2003
Ryder Cup (representing Europe): 1997 (winners)
Seve Trophy (representing Continental Europe): 2003

Equipment
Irons - Mizuno MX-200 3-PW, KBS X flex
Utility - Mizuno MP-Fli Hi 18 degree
Wedges - Mizuno MX Chrome 51, MPT-10 White Satin 58deg

References

External links

Spanish male golfers
European Tour golfers
Ryder Cup competitors for Europe
Golfers from Madrid
1972 births
Living people
20th-century Spanish people
21st-century Spanish people